Stephen Climax is an opera in three acts by Hans Zender, who wrote his own libretto based on James Joyce and Hugo Ball. It was premiered on 15 June 1986 at the Oper Frankfurt, staged by Alfred Kirchner and conducted by Peter Hirsch. The opera was published by Breitkopf & Härtel. A 1990 production at La Monnaie in Brussels was recorded.

History 
Zender wrote his own libretto, based on two literary sources, Hugo Ball's Symeon, der Stylit (Simeon Stylites) from his legends of saints, and the Stephen Dedalus episodes from Ulysses by James Joyce. Zender worked on the opera from 1976 and again from 1984.

Stephen Climax was premiered on 15 June 1986 at the Oper Frankfurt, staged by Alfred Kirchner and conducted by Peter Hirsch. It was the only world premiere at the Oper Frankfurt during the Gielen era. It was also performed at La Monnaie in Brussels in 1990 and the Staatstheater Nürnberg in 1991. The opera was published by Breitkopf & Härtel.

Theme 
A main character of the opera is St Simeon Stylites, as described in the Acta Sanctorum. Joyce used motifs in his Ulysses which Zender read in the German translation by Hans Wollschläger. His story, as a hermit who lives on a column for decades and is venerated as a saint, is juxtaposed with scenes from the novel by Joyce.

Roles 

The action takes place in the Syrian desert and in Dublin at night.

Music 
Stephen Climax is scored for soloists, choir, two orchestral groups, stage music and tape playback. The duration is given as 135 minutes, also as 150 minutes.

Recording 
In 1992, academy released a CD set with a live performance of the 1990 Brussels production, with Dale Duesing as Stephen, Ronald Hamilton as Simeon, Isoldé Elchlepp as Bella, and Ellen Shade as Simeon's mother, and conducted by Sylvain Cambreling.

References

External links 
 Stephen Climax in Opening Night! Opera & Oratorio Premieres, stanford.edu
 Hugo Ball: Byzantinisches Christentum: Drei Heiligenleben. Insel, Frankfurt am Main 1979, ; new edition, edited by Bernd Wacker: Wallstein Verlag, Göttingen 2011, 
 

Operas based on novels
German-language operas
Operas
1986 operas
Ulysses (novel)